From The Sky is the debut studio album by British rock band Blackbud, released on 31 July 2006 on Independiente.

Track listing 
Barefoot Dancing
1:5:8
Switch
Heartbeat
Goodbye Song (Cold Haroundan)
Steal Away
Sitting By the River
Forever
Alone
Days Passing Away
Market Streets (includes hidden track)

Personnel 
Blackbud
Joe Taylor - guitars, vocals, organ
Sam Nadel - drums, percussion, backing vocals
Adam Newton - bass, backing vocals, melodica

Additional personnel
Marie Berard - violin
Annalee Patipatanakoon - viola
Steve Dan - viola
Roman Borys - cello
Lou Pomanti - keyboards

References

2006 debut albums
Blackbud albums
Independiente Records albums
Albums produced by David Bottrill